Anke Huber and Mary Pierce were the defending champions but did not compete that year.

Barbara Schett and Patty Schnyder won in the final 7–6(7–3), 3–6, 6–3 against Martina Hingis and Jana Novotná.

Seeds
Champion seeds are indicated in bold text while text in italics indicates the round in which those seeds were eliminated.

 Martina Hingis /  Jana Novotná (final)
 Arantxa Sánchez-Vicario /  Patricia Tarabini (semifinals)
 Ruxandra Dragomir /  Iva Majoli (semifinals)
 Barbara Schett /  Patty Schnyder (champions)

Draw

External links
 ITF tournament edition details
 Main Draw (WTA)

1998 WTA Tour